Hydrangeoideae is a subfamily of the hydrangea family (Hydrangeaceae). It contains two tribes, Hydrangeeae and Philadelpheae.
The subfamily was described by Gilbert Thomas Burnett in 1835.

Description
Pollen grains from species within the subfamily are often subprolate to subspherical. The leaf venation is largely camptodromous.

References

Hydrangeaceae
Asterid subfamilies